Namhkam Township (also known as Nanhkan Township) is a township of Mu Se District in the Shan State of eastern Myanmar. The principal town is Namhkam, a few miles away from Mu Se.

Inhabitants 

A large majority of the people in Namhkam Township are Shan and Kachin with a smaller presence of the Palaung.

Economy 

According to a survey conducted in 16 villages, poppy cultivation increased from 812 acres (328 hectares) to 1535 acres (617 hectares) within 2006–2007 season and 2008–2009 season.

Unrest 

The Shan State Army-North (SSA-N) and Shan State National Army (SSNA) are active in Namhkam Township. Pansay Militia is one of eight influential militias. Kyaw Myint, head of Pansay Militia, was selected as a USDP candidate of Namhkam for Shan State Hluttaw.

References

Townships of Shan State